Carlsbad Poinsettia station is a commuter rail station in Carlsbad, California that is on the NCTD COASTER commuter rail line. The station serves the Poinsettia and La Costa communities of Carlsbad, and is the southernmost of the two COASTER stations in Carlsbad, the other being Carlsbad Village station about four miles to the north. It is also located about four miles away from the LEGOLAND California Theme Park and five miles from McClellan-Palomar Airport; there are transit services that are provided for transport to those destinations.

History

The station opened along with the other COASTER stations when rail service began on February 27, 1995, servicing the southern communities of Carlsbad in contrast with Carlsbad Village station.

On October 7, 2013, the Amtrak Pacific Surfliner began stopping at four COASTER stations: Carlsbad Village, Carlsbad Poinsettia, Encinitas, and Sorrento Valley. Amtrak dropped service to Carlsbad Poinsettia and Encinitas on October 9, 2017, due to low ridership.

With increasing ridership and a demand for expansion, the station underwent a thirty-four million dollar renovation beginning in May 2018. A pedestrian underpass was constructed (replacing the two at-grade pedestrian crossings at either end of the platforms) and fencing was placed between the tracks, allowing two trains to pass through the station at one time. In addition, the tracks and platforms were realigned slightly west of their old locations, and new signage and canopies were installed. The project was completed in February 2020.

References

External links

COASTER Stations

North County Transit District stations
Carlsbad, California
Railway stations in the United States opened in 1995
Former Amtrak stations in California